James Edward Davis, Jr. (born October 4, 1981 in Highland Springs, Virginia) is a former professional Canadian football defensive end.

Early years
Davis played four seasons of college football as a defensive end for the Virginia Tech Hokies recording 131 tackles, 19 sacks, one fumble recovery, and one interception in 48 games.

Professional career
Davis first signed as an undrafted free agent with the Jacksonville Jaguars of the National Football League in 2005 and appeared in one game before being released in February 2007.

The Edmonton Eskimos signed Davis as a free agent on May 8, 2008, and started and played 14 games in the 2008 CFL season. For his first 11 games, he started at defensive tackle and then switched to defensive end in October. He recording 26 defensive tackles, three knockdowns, six sacks, three tackles for losses (10 yards), and a forced fumble in his first CFL season. He was a final cut on June 25, 2009.

Davis signed with the Calgary Stampeders on August 21, 2009 and was assigned to their practice roster.

References

1981 births
Living people
Players of American football from Virginia
American football defensive ends
Canadian football defensive linemen
American players of Canadian football
Virginia Tech Hokies football players
Jacksonville Jaguars players
Baltimore Ravens players
Edmonton Elks players
Calgary Stampeders players
People from Highland Springs, Virginia